The Nandan Sar Lake is an oval shaped alpine lake located in the Pir Panjal Range in Rajauri district of Jammu and Kashmir, India.

Geography 
Nandan Sar Lake is located at an elevation of about 3500 meters. The lake is one of the biggest in the Poonch district with a maximum length of over 1 kilometer and is famous for its deep blue colour. The water of the lake runs from Jadi Marg Nullah and flows down into the Kashmir Valley.

References

Lakes of Jammu and Kashmir